Lucas Werthein (born 6 October 1981) is an Argentine equestrian. He competed in two events at the 2004 Summer Olympics.

References

External links
 

1981 births
Living people
Argentine male equestrians
Olympic equestrians of Argentina
Equestrians at the 2004 Summer Olympics
Sportspeople from Buenos Aires